"Glider" is a Japanese-language song, and the seventh Japanese single, by South Korean boy band  Boyfriend from their seventh Japanese single album of the same name. This was their restart single after a short hiatus in the Japanese market and their first single released under Kiss Entertainment. The single was released physically on June 1, 2016.

Track listing

Music videos

Release history

References 

Boyfriend (band) songs
2016 songs
2016 singles
Japanese-language songs
Starship Entertainment singles